Rabbi Pesach Eliyahu Falk (1944-January 20, 2020) was a posek in Gateshead. He was both a student and later a frequent lecturer at Gateshead Yeshiva as well as both seminaries for girls. He was well known for his works on Jewish Law concerning the laws of modesty and laws of Shabbos. One of his children, Rabbi Moshe Falk, is a Maggid Shiur in Yeshivas Nachlas Tzvi in Toronto. His sister Rebbetzin Miriam Salomon was married to Rabbi Matisyahu Salomon until her passing in 2016.
Another sister is married to Dayan AD Dunner, a very prominent Rabbi and posek in Stamford Hill, London.
Rabbi Falk died on 23 Teves 5780, 20 January 2020. His funeral took place on the same day in Gateshead, and on the following day in Jerusalem, where he was buried on Har HaMenuchot.

Works
 Modesty: An Adornment for Life (1998), 
 Modesty: An Adornment for Life: Educational Diagrams for the Use of Women and Girls (Supplement; 1998)
 Modesty: An Adornment For Life: Day By Day (two volumes)
 Chosson and Kallah during their Engagement (2001), 
 Honoring Shabbos During the Week (1988)
 Halachos and Attitudes Concerning the Dress of Women and Girls (1993)
 Sheitels: A Halachic Guide to Present-day Sheitels (2002)
 Halachic Guide to the Inspection of Fruits and Vegetables for Insects She'eilos U'Teshuvos Machzeh Eliyahu (Hebrew)
 Zachor V'Shamor: The Laws of Shabbos'' (three volumes)

References

External links
 Rabbi Pesach Eliyahu Falk on Google Books

1944 births
2020 deaths
British writers
British Orthodox rabbis